Joseph Lees may refer to:

Dreaming of Joseph Lees, a 1999 British romantic drama film directed by Eric Styles
 Joseph Lees (writer), author of the 1805 poem in Lancashire dialect Jone o Grinfilt
Joseph Leese (1845-1914), British cricketer and Member of Parliament
Joe Lees (1892–1933), English footballer

See also
Joseph Lee (disambiguation)